Mount Dawson, elevation , is a massif in the Selkirk Mountains of British Columbia, Canada, located in Glacier National Park to the southeast of Rogers Pass.  It is a  double summit, the highest of which is Hasler Peak, the second peak being Feuz Peak, with Hasler Peak's elevation making it the highest summit in Glacier National Park and the second highest in the Selkirks.  Mount Dawson is ranked as the 58th highest mountain in British Columbia. The Dawson Glacier is located on its eastern flank.

Name
Mount Dawson was named 1888 by Reverend W.S. Green for geologist George Mercer Dawson (1846-1901), member of the British North America International Boundary Commission, 1873, later director of the Geological Survey of Canada (1895-1901).

Climate

Based on the Köppen climate classification, Mount Dawson is located in a subarctic climate zone with cold, snowy winters, and mild summers. Temperatures can drop below −20 °C with wind chill factors below −30 °C.

See also

 List of mountains of Canada
 Geography of British Columbia
 Geology of British Columbia

References

Selkirk Mountains
Columbia Country
Glacier National Park (Canada)
Three-thousanders of British Columbia
Kootenay Land District